Machimosauridae is an extinct family of teleosauroid thalattosuchian crocodyliforms. The family was first identified in 2016, when fossils of teleosauroid thalattosuchians, including an indeterminate close relative of Lemmysuchus and Machimosaurus, were described from the Middle Jurassic (Bathonian) of Morocco. The family was largely expanded in 2020 when the systematics of Teleosauroidea were re-reviewed. Members of this family generally were larger than the teleosaurids.

Classification 
Machimosauridae is a diverse group of teleosauroids, phylogenetically defined as "the largest clade within Teleosauroidea containing Machimosaurus hugii, but not Plagiophthalmosuchus gracilirostris and Teleosaurus cadomensis." The members of the Machimosauridae share several unique characters among teleosauroids, which are:

 dorsally oriented external nares
 the premaxillary anterior and anterolateral margins are not sub-vertical and do not extend ventrally
 the premaxilla-maxilla suture is sub-rectangular and slightly interdigitating (most noticeably near the midline)
 no anterolateral expansion of the supratemporal fenestrae
 the postorbital is excluded from the orbit posteroventral margin
 a mostly horizontal pterygoid with a distinct posterolateral angle
 the cultriform process of the basisphenoid is exposed and bifurcates the pterygoids

The phylogenetic relationships of the Machimosauridae were analyzed in a comprehensive analysis of teleosauroid relationships. The results of the analysis are shown below:

Evolution 
Machimosaurids grew in body size and diversified feeding strategies throughout their evolutionary history.

References

Thalattosuchians
Prehistoric reptile families